Mosby Creek may refer to:

 Mosby Creek (Missouri)
 Mosby Creek (Oregon)